Alexander MacLean  (c. 1879 – 29 October 1917) was a Scottish amateur footballer who played in the Scottish League for Queen's Park as a forward.

Personal life 
MacLean worked as a commercial clerk for Glasgow whisky and wine merchants Messrs Mitchell Bros Ltd. On 9 December 1915, during the First World War he enlisted as a private in the Cameronians (Scottish Rifles). He was discharged due to illness in September 1917 and died of tuberculosis at Ruchill Hospital on 29 October 1917.

Career statistics

References 

1917 deaths
Cameronians soldiers
Scottish footballers
Queen's Park F.C. players
Scottish Football League players
Strathclyde F.C. players
Association football forwards
British Army personnel of World War I
20th-century deaths from tuberculosis
Heart of Midlothian F.C. players
Tuberculosis deaths in Scotland
Clerks
1870s births